Octave Uzanne (14 September 1851 – 31 October 1931) was a 19th-century French bibliophile, writer, publisher, and journalist.

He is noted for his literary research on the authors of the 18th century. He published many previously unpublished works by authors including Paradis Moncrif, Benserade, Caylus, Besenval, the Marquis de Sade and Baudelaire. He founded the Société des Bibliophiles Contemporaines, of which he was president. His research produced a considerable literary output and frequent publications in newspapers such as L'Echo, Le Plume, Dépêche de Toulouse, Le Mercure de France, Le Gaulois and Le Figaro of Paris.

One of the topics his research focused on was the discussion of fashion and femininity in the French fin-de-siècle. This took the form of monographs and works including Son Altesse la femme (French for Her Highness Woman), Féminies and La Française du siècle (The Frenchwoman of the Century). His own works include novels and fantasy books, such as Surprises du Coeur and Contes pour les bibliophiles (Tales for bibliophiles).

Biography

Early life 
Louis Octave Uzanne was born on 14 September 1851 in Auxerre, to a bourgeois family originating from Savoy. His parents were Charles-Auguste Omer Uzanne, a merchant, and Elisabeth Laurence Octavie; his elder brother Joseph, had been born the previous year. His classical studies began in his home town; he moved to Paris after his father's death to study at the Collège Rollin in Paris—a residential school for the children of the French upper-class. In Paris he became interested in the evolution and history of manuscripts and books. During the Franco-Prussian War of 1870–1871 he was attached to a school at Richmond in England. Continuing with law studies, he abandoned this line of work when he came into an inheritance in 1872, allowing him to pursue his literary interests.

He became a regular visitor of the Library of the Arsenal, where he joined a group of followers of the former librarian, Charles Nodier, along with the journalist Charles Monselet, writer Loredan Larchey, and author and bibliophile Paul Lacroix. He also joined the Société des Amis des Livres (founded in 1874), the first French bibliophilic association since the Société des Bibliophiles François (founded in 1820).

At the start of his career, Uzanne focused on the lesser-known writers of the 18th century, creating four volumes of work published by Jouast, and an additional 20+ volumes published by Albert Quantin. He was an admirer of the Goncourt brothers, who were also writers on the subject of 18th-century France. Uzanne looked for mentors who were bibliophiles like him, rather than literary scholars (érudits) like his companions at the Arsenal. While focusing on past subjects, he was very up-to-date on the technical aspects of printing and publishing. His 1879 work Le bric-à-brac de l'amour (literally, A bric-a-brac of love) was one of the first to employ the gillotage, a zincography technique, and photo-mechanical reproduction. Jackson points out that Uzanne, in Les Zigzags d'un curieux (literally, Zigzags of a Curious Man), divided the book collectors in two groups: those who are interested in the book as if it were a kind of stock market share (valeur de Bourse), a market quotation whose fluctuations "they follow with a gamester's interest", and those—whom he considers "pures"—attracted to the book itself, its contents, rarity or beauty.

Bibliophile and journalist 

After leaving the Société des Amis des Livres, which he found too conservative and too concerned with the reissue of old works, he started two new bibliographic societies, the Société des Bibliophiles Contemporaines (1889–1894) and the Societé des Bibliophiles Indépendants (1896–1901). The first consisted of 160 people, including the writers Jules Claretie and Jean Richepin, the artists Albert Robida and Paul Avril, and the journalist and critic Francisque Sarcey. Uzanne also edited two magazines, Conseiller du bibliophile (literally, Adviser of bibliophile, 1876–1877) and Les miscellanées bibliographiques (The Bibliographical Miscellany, 1878–1880), and then ran three consecutive bibliophilic magazines: Le livre : bibliographie moderne (literally, The Book: Modern Bibliography, 1880–1889), Le livre moderne : revue du monde littéraire et des bibliophiles contemporaines (literally, The Modern Book: Journal of the Literary World and Contemporary Bibliophiles, 1890–1891), and L'Art et l'Idée : revue contemporaine du dilettantisme l'littéraire et de la curiosité (Art and Ideas: Contemporary Journal of the Literary Dilettantism and Curiosity, 1892–1893). In the early 1890s, he was considered to be "... the best authority that book lovers know on subjects specially interesting to book lovers". Nevertheless, such books as Le Miroir du Monde (The Mirror of the World) or L'ombrelle – le gant – le manchon (The Sunshade, Muff, and Glove) received negative reviews from some newspapers for Avril's illustrations.

In contrast to most bibliophiles of his time, Uzanne was chiefly interested in the creation of new, luxurious bibliophile works, collaborating closely with printers, binders, typographers and artists (especially the Symbolists and early Art Nouveau artists). Among them were such painters as James McNeill Whistler, Adolphe Lalauze and Jules Barbey d'Aurevilly—who wrote the preface of Le bric-à-brac de l'amour (1879)—, the writer Jean Lorrain, and jewellery artists and exponents of Japonisme such as Henri Vever. One of the main artists collaborating with Uzanne was the Belgian Félicien Rops, who illustrated some of his books and created the cover illustration for Le Livre Moderne, and who called Uzanne "the Bibliophile's dream". The overall quality of Uzanne's books was remarked upon by The New York Times when reviewing his 1894 work La Femme à Paris: "The book is a highly-artistic achievement in a typographical sense ... This artistic element and the style of the author ... elevate the work from its sphere of usefulness into the sphere of pure literature. It will be serviceable a century from now to students of our civilization." Other symbolic works of art were Féminies (1896), in which Rops illustrated many scenes of worldly life, or Son Altesse la femme (Her Highness Woman, 1885), on which he drew a naked witch in the chapter on medieval women. In the work he explored the lives of women at all levels of French society of his time. But also, according to Silverman, Uzanne associate feminism with a dangerous debauchery of sexual and moral investment, making full use a series of medical and philosophical sources, with the intention of proving the inability of women to merge into public life and the labour market, because of their temperament. Uzanne further indicated that the female figure and ornaments were essential in the French decorative arts, something that was missing in the early 20th century.

Uzanne's bibliophile activity in the early 1880s coincided with the gradual abandonment of manual methods of printing illustrations kin favour of photomechanized methods. His collection of contemporary bibliophilic books was sold in 1894 by Hôtel Drouot. It contained some of the finest examples of late 19th-century French bookbinding, by binders like Charles Meunier, Lucien Magnin, Pétrus Ruban, Camille Martin, René Wiener and Victor Prouvé.

Uzanne was also well known in the literary circles of his day, as attested by this poem of Stéphane Mallarmé in Vers de circonstance (1920):

As a journalist, sometimes employing the pseudonym "la Cagoule", Uzanne wrote for L'Écho de Paris, Le Gaulois and other newspapers. In addition, for other French and foreign magazines like The Studio, Magazine of Art, and Scribner's Magazine, for which he wrote in 1894 an article, "The End of Books", which he thought would come because of the rise of phonography, where he predicted the rise of radio and television. Uzanne was fascinated by modern technology and the possibilities it offered for the reproduction and dissemination of words, sounds, and images, which was evidenced not only in that article or in his groundbreaking work in book publishing, but also in an article he wrote in 1893 for the French newspaper Le Figaro, about a visit he made to US President Grover Cleveland and the inventor Thomas Edison during the EXPO Chicago 1893, where he witnessed the Kinetograph shortly before it went public.

In general, Silverman assigned to him "anti-Semitic tendencies" and the Bibliothèque nationale de France is credited with the authorship of the anti-Semitic pamphlet Israël chez John Bull : l'Angleterre juive (1913), under the pseudonym "Théo-Doedalus". The journalist Gustave Geffroy, in the prologue of Pietro Longhi (1924) by Uzanne, also listed this work among other works of Uzanne. On this pamphlet, he criticized the British government, including figures as Benjamin Disraeli and Nathan Mayer Rothschild. Uzanne collaborated with Edouard Drumont on his antisemitic newspaper La Libre Parole. Drumont and Uzanne held a cordial friendship through mail, and Uzanne helped him in the publication of the essay La France juive (Jewish France, 1886).

As an art critic, Uzanne wrote several reviews of etchings, as in a critique of French painter and illustrator Félix Buhot: "Buhot is a visionary, one obsessed by the picturesqueness of modern life; nervous to excess, tortured by a crowd of fleeting impressions and queer ideas, he suffered from a cruel inability to reproduce them as he wished." Uzanne's written style was characterized by the use of Anglicisms and eccentric neologisms.

Fashion writer

Another of Uzanne's interests was female fashion, about which he wrote a number of books and articles that were later translated into English. Specifically, he was focused on the image of the Parisienne, the women of Paris. Uzanne is perceived by some to have had a desire to revive French national pride; he shared the nationalistic feelings of other members of the generation who had experienced the defeat by Prussia in 1870. This was reflected in their efforts to promote a renewal of the decorative arts. Silverman mentions that Uzanne believed that married bourgeois women should not only decorate the walls of their homes, but also "cultivate luxury and art in an ornament ignored by their aristocratic predecessors: their undergarments". Uzanne felt that the eroticism of the theatrical atmosphere was no longer what it had been and had become "more moral, more bourgeois". His first and perhaps most famous book on fashion was L'Éventail (1882, translated as The Fan in 1884), a "delightful" illustrated story about the hand fans. He admitted that his book "in no way a work of powerful wisdom and erudition", but simply the first in a projected series of "little books for the boudoir".

His second book about fashion, L'ombrelle – le gant – le manchon (1883, translated in the same year as The Sunshade, Muff, and Glove), was also illustrated in rococo style by Paul Avril; in one of its lines Uzanne emphasized a female clothing accessory: "The muff!", he said, "Its name alone has something adorable, downy, and voluptuous about it." Later he published Les ornements de la femme (1892), that reproduced in one volume the combined texts of L'Éventail and L'ombrelle – le gant – le manchon. His 1898 work Monument esthématique du XIXe siècle : Les Modes de Paris, translated as Fashions in Paris, was according to the review in The New York Times "... the most complete and exhaustive work on the subject of French fashions that has yet appeared". However, in this book he wanted to re-establish the intimate and feminine culture of the rococo—but during his life he became influenced by modernism— and also he criticized the "sartorial severity" of the femme nouvelle.

An example of the historical novel is La Française du siècle (1886, published in English as The Frenchwoman of the Century in 1887), where Uzanne suggests that the effect of the Revolution on the woman of the period was "lamentable and disastrous": "All French spirit, grace, and finesse seemed to have been submerged in the bloody deliriums of the crowd." In a couple of chapters of the book he described the France of the late Eighteenth Century, during the French Revolution; some of its pages exhibited the "frivolity of women" during those years. For example, in a chapter on one of the stages of the French Revolution—known as the Directory— he included descriptions of customs such as the bals des victimes: to these dancing assemblies, held at the Hôtel Richelieu, only admitted "aristocrats who could boast a relative guillotined during the Terror"; he wrote that women cut their hair, as if they would be guillotined—some even carried a red ribbon around their neck. Uzanne disclosed that the five Directors who had established themselves at the Luxembourg formed a kind of Court-society, and gave frequent entertainments: the queens of this society were de Staël, Hamelin, Bonaparte and Tallien.

Although he focuses on the French Revolution, the story ends in the 1880s, shortly after the Second French Empire, closely following the evolution of society and women (see also Historiography of the French Revolution). Later, he republished what was essentially is the same book but with a different title, in both French and English: La Femme et la mode. Métamorphoses de la parisienne de 1792 à 1892 or Woman and Fashion: Metamorphoses of the Parisienne 1792–1892 in the English version (1892), and Les Modes de Paris. Variations du goût et de l'esthétique de la femme, 1797–1897 (1897). According to the Westminster Review, the English edition was practically a facsimile of the French, and the translator literally wrote the sentences to the point of unintelligibility.

Later life and death 

Uzanne never married, and in later life he wrote in praise of celibacy; however, according to Remy de Gourmont, in writing about women Uzanne would not have been one of those authors who "exalted ambrosia without having tasted it". Uzanne's feelings toward women, as well as those of Jules Barbey d'Aurevilly, were ambivalent in nature, a mixture of attraction and indifference. He also explored the concept of woman artists, subscribing to the view that women lack creative ability, a quality he associated solely with men: "The curious and paradoxical physiologist [Cesare Lombroso?] has argued that the woman genius does not exist, and when such genius manifests itself it is a hoax of nature; in this sense, she is male." Based on that, Uzanne said that women artists perpetrated mediocre studies and exhibitions of painting and sculpture, and used this argument to support the idea that gender difference is the foundation of creativity.

Silverman mentions that he became in an "archetypal figure of the Belle Époque", a "handsome monsieur with a beard" (joli monsieur avec une barbe) admired by Félicien Rops, and an "elegant storyteller" (l'élégant conteur) according to Anatole France. Silverman notes a contrast between the snobbish, dandy and reactionary side of Uzanne with a penchant for forgotten authors of the 17th and 18th centuries, and he, in turn, was an innovative artist and bibliophile, the antithesis of the antique collectors of the "old guard", formed by bibliophiles—mostly aristocrats—who organised the Société des Bibliophiles François. Uzanne spent his last years in his apartment in Saint-Cloud, where he died on 21 October 1931. His remains were cremated at the crematorium and cemetery Père Lachaise.

Selected bibliography of works by Uzanne

1875–1878: Poètes de ruelles au XVIIe siècle, 4 volumes edited by Uzanne, printed by Damase Jouast: followed by Les Petits Conteurs du XVIIIe siècle, 12 volumes edited by Uzanne, and Documents sur les Mœurs du XVIIIe siècle, 4 volumes edited by Uzanne
1878: Les Caprices d'un bibliophile, published by Édouard Rouveyre
1879: Le bric-à-brac de l'amour, illustrated by Adolphe Lalauze, with a foreword by Barbey d'Aurevilly, published by Édouard Rouveyre
1880: Le Calendrier de Vénus
1881: Les Surprises du cœur, illustrated by Paul Avril, published by Édouard Rouveyre
1882: L'éventail: illustrated by Paul Avril, published by Quantin; published in English as The Fan by John C. Nimmo in 1884
1883: L'Ombrelle – Le Gant – Le Manchon, illustrated by Paul Avril, published by Quantin; published in English as The sunshade, muff, and glove by John C. Nimmo in London in 1883
1885: Son Altesse la Femme (literally Her Highness Woman), published in Paris; no English edition
1886: La Française du siècle : modes, mœurs, usages, illustrated by Albert Lynch, published by Quantin, republished in 1893: published in English as The Frenchwoman of the Century, John C. Nimmo, London; also published by Routledge in 1887
1886: Nos amis les livres. Causeries sur la littérature curieuse et la librairie, published by Quantin
1887: La Reliure moderne artistique et fantaisiste
1888: Les Zigzags d'un curieux. Causeries sur l'art des livres et la littérature d'art, published by Quantin
1888: Le Miroir du Monde : notes et sensations de la vie pittoresque, illustrated by Paul Avril, published by Quantin; published as The Mirror of the World by John C. Nimmo in 1889
1890: Le Paroissien du Célibataire
1892: la Femme et la mode
1892: Les Ornements de la femme: combined edition of L'éventail and L'ombrelle – le gant – le manchon, published in Paris by Quantin
1893: Vingt Jours dans le Nouveau Monde, published by May et Motteroz
1893: Bouquinistes et bouquineurs : physiologie des quais de Paris, du Pont-Royal au Pont Sully, published by may et Motteroz; translated as The Bookhunter in Paris, Elliot Stock, 1895
1894: La Femme à Paris – nos contemporaines, illustrated by Pierre Vidal, cover art by Léon Rudnicki, published by Quantin; published in English in 1894 by Heinemann
1895: Contes pour les bibliophiles, co-authored with Albert Robida, typography by George Auriol; translated as Tales for bibliophiles, Chicago, The Caxton Club, 1929
1896: Badauderies parisiennes. Les rassemblements. Physiologies de la rue, illustrated by Félix Vallotton, preface by Uzanne, published by Uzanne
1896: Dictionnaire bibliosophique, typologique, iconophilesque, bibliopégique et bibliotechnique a l'usage des bibliognostes, des bibliomanes et des bibliophlistins, published by Uzanne
1896: Contes de la Vingtième Année. Anthology of Bric à Brac de l'Amour, Calendrier de Vénus, and Surprises du Cæur, published by Floury.
1897: La Nouvelle Bibliopolis : voyage d'un novateur au pays des néo-icono-bibliomanes, illustrated by Félicien Rops, published by Floury
1898: L'Art dans la décoration extérieure des livres en France et à l'etranger. Les couvertures illustrées, les cartonnages d'éditeurs, la reliure d'art, binding by Louis Guingot
1898: Monument esthématique du XIXe siècle : Les Modes de Paris, variations du goût et de l'esthétique de la femme, 1797–1897, illustrated by François Courboin, published by L.-H. May; translated into English as Fashion in Paris by Lady Mary Lloyd, published by Heinemann, London in 1898; republished in 1901 in a cheaper edition
1900: L'Art et les artifices de beauté (5th edition in 1902)
1904: The French Bookbinders of the eighteenth century, Chicago, Caxton Club, translated by Mabel McIlvaine.
1908: Drawings by Watteau, London, George Newnes
1910: Études de sociologie féminine : Parisiennes de ce temps et leurs divers milieux, états et conditions, published by Mercure de France; published in English in 1912 as The Modern Parisienne by Heinemann, London and by G. P. Putnam's Sons, New York; published in German as Die Pariserin. Studien zur Geschichte der Frau der Gesellschaft der Französischen Galanterie und der Zeitgenössischen Sitten in 1929 by Paul Aretz, Dresden.
1911: Sottisier des mœurs, published by Émile-Paul
1912: La Locomotion à travers le temps, les mœurs et l'espace
1914: Instantanés d'Angleterre, published by Payot

Theatre and nightlife of France were also covered in his criticisms: shortly before the First World War, he wrote that "the public is accustomed to the irregular life of an actress ... and each spectator gives himself the pleasure of imagining a possible liaison with one of these queens of the footlights." Uzanne's literary output in the early twentieth century declined to minor journal articles and inexpensive editions in cheap-format books; for example, his 1902 book L'art et les artifices de la beauté only contained illustrations in black and white. Uzanne also contributed notes, forewords or commentary to a number of other books, as an appendix in The two young brides (1902, English translation of Mémoires de deux jeunes mariées), whose theme was portraits:

Notes

Footnotes

Citations

References

Further literature

External links

 
 
 
 Works by Uzanne in the Catalogue Gallica/BNF 
 "The End of Books" by Uzanne (illustrated by Albert Robida), on the website of the University of Adelaide

1851 births
1931 deaths
Bibliophiles
People from Auxerre
French art critics
French literary historians
French non-fiction writers
19th-century French writers
20th-century French writers
19th-century French male writers
20th-century French male writers
French male non-fiction writers